Ángel Cuetos (1 August 1936 – 10 June 2016) was a Spanish wrestler. He competed in the men's Greco-Roman welterweight at the 1960 Summer Olympics.

References

External links
 

1936 births
2016 deaths
Spanish male sport wrestlers
Olympic wrestlers of Spain
Wrestlers at the 1960 Summer Olympics
People from Cantabria
20th-century Spanish people